The S6 district lies within in the City of Sheffield, South Yorkshire, England.  The district contains 180 listed buildings that are recorded in the National Heritage List for England.  Of these, one is listed at Grade I, the highest of the three grades, four are at Grade II*, the middle grade, and the others are at Grade II, the lowest grade.  The district is in the north west of the city of Sheffield, and covers the areas of Bradfield, Dungworth, Hillsborough, Loxley, Malin Bridge, Middlewood, Stannington, Upperthorpe, Wadsley and Walkley.

For neighbouring areas, see listed buildings in S3, listed buildings in S5, listed buildings in S10, listed buildings in S35, listed buildings in Derwent, Derbyshire, listed buildings in Hathersage, listed buildings in Midhopestones and listed buildings in Stocksbridge.



Key

Buildings

References 

List of all the listed buildings within Sheffield City Council's boundary (available to download)

Sources

 
Sheffield